Cantharidella ocellina, common name the eyelet top shell, is a species of sea snail, a marine gastropod mollusk in the family Trochidae, the top snails.

Description
The size of the shell attains 4 mm. The small, solid, imperforate shell has a conical shape with a gradate spire with five whorls. It is prominently keeled at the periphery and again at the shoulder. Below the periphery the colour is uniform buff, above it broad, radial stripes of buff pink, alternate with white. Along the periphery are pairs of dashes of madder brown, sometimes these enclose a tinted space and have a background of opaque white, thus assuming an ocellated aspect. The apex is pink. The base of the shell shows seven fiat evenly-spaced concentric riblets. A strong, revolving cord defines the periphery and ascends the spire. The last and penultimate whorls have four spiral riblets above the periphery, the uppermost stronger and forming the angle of a subsutural shelf. The upper whorls are smooth. The aperture is round. The simple outer lip is dentate by the spirals. The columella is perpendicular.

Distribution
This marine species is endemic to Australia and occurs off South Australia.

References

 Hedley, C. 1911. Report on the Mollusca obtained by the F.I.S. 'Endeavour' chiefly off Cape Wiles South Australia. Part 1. Zoological Results of the Fisheries Experiments carried out by F.I.S. "Endeavour" 1: 89-114
 Cotton, B.C. 1959. South Australian Mollusca. Archaeogastropoda. Handbook of the Flora and Fauna of South Australia. Adelaide : South Australian Government Printer 449 pp.
 Wilson, B. 1993. Australian Marine Shells. Prosobranch Gastropods. Kallaroo, Western Australia : Odyssey Publishing Vol. 1 408 pp.

External links
 To World Register of Marine Species

ocellina
Gastropods of Australia
Gastropods described in 1911